Wraith: The Great War is a role-playing book published by White Wolf Publishing in May 1999.

Description
Wraith: The Great War is a historical setting developed for Wraith: The Oblivion, which is set during and immediately after World War I.

Publication history
White Wolf Publishing announced in 1998 that they were reorganizing their business, and the Wraith: The Oblivion line was cancelled as a result. White Wolf followed the game up with a related historical role-playing game in April 1999, Wraith: The Great War, which was published as a one-off game, unlike the other historical role-playing games which the company was publishing for the other World of Darkness lines at that time.

Reception
SF Site thought the game had a great narrative pull, and that it was the kind of supplement that made them want to play Wraith: The Oblivion.

References

External links
Guide du Rôliste Galactique

Historical role-playing games
Horror role-playing games
Role-playing games introduced in 1999
Wraith: The Oblivion